The HD Pentax-DA 20-40mm F2.8-4 ED Limited DC WR is an advanced standard zoom lens for Pentax APS-C DSLR cameras announced by Ricoh on November 6, 2013. Being part of Pentax's Limited series, it features a metal barrel and a comparably small form factor. Within the Limited series, it is the first zoom lens as well as the first lens to feature a silent built-in autofocus motor (DC) and weather resistance (WR).

References
www.dpreview.com

External links

20
Camera lenses introduced in 2013